Adam Adeoye Oluwaseyi Yusuff (born 25 May 1994) is an English professional footballer who plays as a striker for Hornchurch.

Career
Yusuff started his career in the youth system at Stevenage, signing a two-year scholarship in the summer of 2010. In March 2012, he joined South Midlands League Premier Division side Biggleswade United on work experience. During his time with the club he scored eight goals, including a hat-trick and man-of-the-match display in a 4–2 win over Oxhey Jets.

In April 2012, he was released by Stevenage after he had completed his scholarship. Following his release he enrolled with the Tresham College of Further and Higher Education in Kettering, where he played for the under-21 development side in the Conference Reserve League.

In October 2012, he signed for Southern Football League Premier Division side St Neots Town, where he went on to make fifteen appearances in all competitions scoring twice.

In January 2013, he moved to fellow Southern Football League Premier Division side Banbury United for a brief period, only making two appearances.

In February 2013, he joined Football League Championship side Ipswich Town on trial, featuring in a 4–3 reserve side win over Colchester United.

He started the 2013–14 season with Isthmian League Premier Division side AFC Hornchurch after impressing in pre-season, and he was mainly used in the role of impact substitute, scoring late in games against Margate and Wealdstone. He made a total of fifteen appearances for the Urchins scoring three times.

In November 2013, he joined Isthmian League Division One North side Aveley to get more match practice, however he stayed with the club for less than a month.

Shortly after he signed for fellow Isthmian League Division One North side Chatham Town. He enjoyed a successful ten-month spell at the club scoring 24 goals in 38 appearances, which attracted interest from many Football League clubs. After netting seven goals in the first nine games of the 2014–15 campaign for Chatham, he was signed by Football League Two side Dagenham & Redbridge in September 2014 for an undisclosed fee, signing a one-year contract with the club. Despite turning professional, he kept his job working as a waiter in a Wagamama restaurant in Kent. He made his professional debut in the same month in a 3–2 defeat to Cambridge United, replacing Andre Boucaud as a substitute. His first professional goals for the club came in October 2014, where he scored a brace in the 2–1 victory over Accrington Stanley.

In September 2015, he joined National League South side St Albans City on a one-month loan deal.

In October 2015, he joined Isthmian League Premier Division side Leatherhead on a one-month loan deal.

In November 2015, he was sent out on loan again to the Isthmian League Premier Division joining East Thurrock United.

In February 2016, he joined National League side Welling United on loan until the end of the season along with Ian Gayle.

In May 2016 as his contract expired, he was released along with eleven players as Dagenham were relegated to the National League. In June 2016, following his release he rejoined former club Chatham Town on a free transfer.

He left Folkestone after 102 appearances which saw him score 51 goals and joined Dulwich Hamlet in 2019 before moving to Dover Athletic where he spent the remainder of the 2019–20 season before being released.

Yusuff returned to Folkestone Invicta in May 2021. During the 21/22 season he scored a total of 29 goals across all competitions, the club finished in 6th place in the Isthmian Premier Division and finished 4 points outside the play-offs, just behind 5th place Cheshunt F.C., who were promoted to national league south. Yussuf and Folkestone also made it to the Kent Senior Cup final, losing 6–2 to Dartford F.C.and taking home a runners-up medal. On 10 February 2023, Yusuff joined league rivals Hornchurch for an undisclosed fee.

Career statistics

References

External links

1994 births
Living people
People from the London Borough of Lewisham
English footballers
Stevenage F.C. players
Biggleswade United F.C. players
St Neots Town F.C. players
Banbury United F.C. players
Hornchurch F.C. players
Aveley F.C. players
Chatham Town F.C. players
Dagenham & Redbridge F.C. players
St Albans City F.C. players
Leatherhead F.C. players
East Thurrock United F.C. players
Welling United F.C. players
Heybridge Swifts F.C. players
Folkestone Invicta F.C. players
Dover Athletic F.C. players
Tonbridge Angels F.C. players
Dulwich Hamlet F.C. players
Cray Valley Paper Mills F.C. players
Braintree Town F.C. players
English Football League players
National League (English football) players
Isthmian League players
Southern Football League players
Association football forwards